The Flaid was a Belgian automobile manufactured from 1920 until 1921 in Liège.  A 10/12 hp light car with 1095 cc four-cylinder engine, it was designed for export to Britain. A stand was booked at the 1920 British Motor Show but the car never appeared.

References 

 David Burgess Wise, The New Illustrated Encyclopedia of Automobiles.

Defunct motor vehicle manufacturers of Belgium
History of Liège